The Palais de Danse was a large dance hall located next to the Palais Theatre in the entertainment precinct of the foreshore of , a beachside inner suburb of Melbourne, Victoria, Australia. Built in 1919, it featured a remarkable geometric interior created in 1920 by the renowned architects Walter Burley Griffin and his wife, Marion Griffin (1871–1961), and it was a popular entertainment venue throughout the early 20th century. The building was destroyed by fire in 1969.

History
Confusingly, over a period of 15 years, there have been four different buildings with the name Palais in this location and next door, the site of the current Palais Theatre, all built by the Phillips brothers (who had also built Luna Park in 1912). The first Palais de Danse was a timber, arched roofed structure built in 1913 on the site currently occupied by the Palais Theatre. It was converted to also show pictures in 1915, becoming the first Palais Theatre.

Also located on the Lower Esplanade was the Daylight Pictures Co. open air cinema, which in 1914 was converted to a live venue, the Comedy Theatre.

In 1919, a large steel framed arched structure was built over the Palais, which was then relocated next door to become the Palais de Danse (again), while the new larger arched building became the Palais Pictures. The Palais Pictures building was destroyed by fire in 1926, and rebuilt in 1927, the present Palais Theatre.

The Palais de Danse could hold as many as 2,870 patrons, and was a popular venue throughout its life, and is remembered for its magical atmosphere. On hot nights, the louvered wall panels hinged up, to capture sea breezes wafting off the bay.

The second Palais de Danse was destroyed by fire in 1969.

Architecture 
The 1919 Palais de Danse exterior (designer unknown) was dominated by a large arched form following that of the roof, anchored by large square piers each side, decorated with delicate classical details, and topped by fanciful stepped turrets.

The interior design created c1920 was designed by the renowned American-Australian architect Walter Burley Griffin (1876–1937) and his wife, Marion Griffin (1871–1961). The dance floor was surrounded by seating areas behind abstracted fluted Doric columns, which supported a remarkable frieze of complex, prismatic, up-lit panels. The ceiling, at first just the exposed metal trusses of the roof, was soon concealed by low pitched angled ribbing, from which hung three rows of large geometrically decorated prismatic lamps.

References

External links
National Library of Australia

Demolished buildings and structures in Melbourne
St Kilda, Victoria
1919 establishments in Australia
Buildings and structures demolished in 1969
1969 disestablishments in Australia
Buildings and structures completed in 1969
Walter Burley Griffin buildings
1969 fires in Oceania
1969 disasters in Australia